Nha Sentimento is the eleventh and final studio album by Cesária Évora.

Track listing 
 "Serpentina"
 "Verde cabo di nhas odjos"
 "Vento de sueste"
 "Ligereza"
 "Zinha"
 "Fatalidade"
 "Esperança di mar azul"
 "Sentimento"
 "Tchom frio"
 "Noiva de ceu"
 "Holandesa co certeza"
 "Resposta menininhas de monte sossego"
 "Mam’bia e so mi"
 "Parceria e irmandade"

Charts

Certifications

References

External links 
 Nha Sentimento at Allmusic

2009 albums
Cesária Évora albums